Recruitment is the process of filling job vacancies with people.

Recruitment or recruiting may also refer to:
Recruitment (biology), the process of developing the next generation of organisms
College recruiting, the process in college athletics whereby coaches add new players to their roster 
Military recruitment, the process of requesting people to join a military voluntarily
Motor unit recruitment, the progressive activation of a muscle 
The 17th century English process of filling vacant parliamentary seats during recruiter elections
Recruitment (medicine), a medical condition of the inner ear that leads to reduced tolerance of loudness

See also 
 Recruit